Armorial of the speakers of the House of Commons is displayed at the House of Commons in the Palace of Westminster. Speakers customarily took a grant of arms while in office if they were not armigerous already. Their shields of arms are painted on the interior walls of Speaker's House.

Earlier parlours and prolocutors (1258-1376)

Richard II (1377-1399)

Henry IV (1399-1413)

Henry V (1413-1422)

Henry VI (1422-1461)

Edward IV (1461-1483)

No parliament was summoned during Edward V's brief reign.

Richard III (1483-1485)

Henry VII (1485-1509)

Henry VIII (1509-1547)

Edward VI (1547-1553)

Mary I (1553-1558)

Elizabeth I (1558-1603)

James I (1603-1625)

Charles I (1625-1649)

Interregnum (1649-1660)

Charles II (1660-1685)

William III (1688-1702)

Following the Acts of Union 1707, Smith became the first Speaker of the House of Commons of Great Britain.

References
 Palace of Westminster, Speaker's House, photographic gallery by Basil Manning.
 The Lives of the Speakers of the House of Commons, book by James Alexander Manning, 1850.

Personal armorials
Armorials of the United Kingdom